Henry Arthur Evans (24 September 1898 – 25 September 1958), known as Arthur Evans, was a UK politician.

He contested the 1922 London County Council election as a Progressive candidate for Lewisham West but was unsuccessful.

He was National Liberal Party Member of Parliament (MP) for Leicester East from 1922 to 1923 and Conservative MP for Cardiff South from 1924 to 1929, and from 1931 to 1945.  At the 1945 general election he was defeated by the future Labour Prime Minister James Callaghan.

References

External links 
 

1898 births
1958 deaths
Members of the Parliament of the United Kingdom for Cardiff constituencies
Members of the Parliament of the United Kingdom for English constituencies
UK MPs 1924–1929
UK MPs 1931–1935
UK MPs 1935–1945
Conservative Party (UK) MPs for Welsh constituencies
National Liberal Party (UK, 1922) politicians